Jakub 'Kuba' Smrž (born 7 April 1983 in České Budějovice, Czechoslovakia) is a professional motorcycle road racer. He currently competes in the Superbike World Championship, aboard a Yamaha YZF-R1. For 2017 and 2018 he rode a BMW S1000RR in the British Superbike Championship, but in June 2018 he suffered a serious shoulder injury when guest-riding for Czech BMW team Mercury Racing in the Oschersleben eight-hour event in Germany. Luke Hedger rode Smrž' machine in his absence.

For 2015 Smrž was contracted to ride a Ducati Panigale in the British Superbike Championship for Moto Rapido Racing, but after a crash and injury in the fourth round at Snetterton, was replaced mid-season by John Hopkins. For the last three races of 2015, Smrž was drafted-in by Shaun Muir Racing to compete aboard a Yamaha YZF-R1.

Career
He remained in the 250cc World Championship until , finishing 12th overall with a best of 7th that year.

For  he was the surprise choice to replace Roberto Rolfo at the formerly race-winning SC Caracchi Ducati team in the Superbike World Championship. On a customer Ducati 999 F05 he frequently troubled the top sixteen in qualifying. He finished the season 14th with a best race result of 8th.

For  he rode a customer Ducati 1098 RS 08 for the Guandalini Racing by Grifo's team. He finished the 2008 season in 13th place in the championship.

For  Smrž continued with the Guandalini Racing Team, gaining his first podium finish (3rd) in the fourth round of the season at Assen and first pole position in the eighth round at Misano Adriatico. This time he finished 10th overall.

Smrž remained with the team in 2010, running under the B&G moniker after a partnership deal with the former Sterilgarda Ducati team. After a string of mechanical failures midseason, the team switched to an Aprilia bike, marking the first time Smrž had ridden anything other than a Ducati in the class. He was the fastest Aprilia in qualifying at Silverstone.

Smrž lives in Zlín.

Career statistics

Grand Prix motorcycle racing

By season

By class

Races by year
(key) (Races in bold indicate pole position) (Races in italics indicate fastest lap)

Superbike World Championship

Races by year
(key) (Races in bold indicate pole position) (Races in italics indicate fastest lap)

British Superbike Championship

Races by year
(key) (Races in bold indicate pole position) (Races in italics indicate fastest lap)

References

External links 

 fansofsmrz.cz  Official website
 Profile on MotoGP.com
 Profile on WorldSBK.com

Superbike World Championship riders
British Superbike Championship riders
FIM Superstock 1000 Cup riders
125cc World Championship riders
250cc World Championship riders
1983 births
Living people
Czech motorcycle racers
Sportspeople from České Budějovice